HD 88836, also known as HR 4019, is a solitary, yellow-hued star located in the southern constellation Antlia. It has an apparent magnitude of 6.32, placing it near the limit for naked eye visibility.

HD 88836 has a stellar classification of G8 III, indicating that it is an evolved red giant. Gaia Data Release 3 stellar evolution models place it on the red giant branch. At present it has 2.3 times the mass of the Sun but has expanded to 10 times its girth. HD 88836 metallicity – what astronomers dub as a star's abundance of elements heavier than helium – is around solar level.

It is unknown if its physically related to HD 88836 or not, although its Gaia Data Release 3 parallax is much smaller than HD 88836's.

References

External links
 Image HD 88836

Antlia
088836
Double stars
G-type giants
4019
050122
CD-36 06225
Antliae, 56